The  is a railway line in Kyushu, southern Japan, operated by the Kyushu Railway Company (JR Kyushu). It connects the west and east coasts of the island. The line originates at Kumamoto Station in Kumamoto and ends at terminal of Ōita Station in Ōita.

Data
Gauge: 
Length: 148.0 km
Stations: 37 (including terminals)
Track: Single track
Electrification: 
Kumamoto - Higo Ōzu: 20 kV AC (60 Hz)
Higo Ōzu - Ōita: None

Maximum service speed: 95 km/h (59 mph)

Stations
•: Stops, 
|: Passes through

History
Construction of the line commenced from both Oita and Kumamoto in 1914, with connection being achieved with the opening of the Miyaji - Tamarai section in 1928.

Steam locomotives were withdrawn from the line in 1973, and CTC signalling was commissioned on the entire line in 1983. The 22.5 km Kumamoto - Higoozu section was electrified in 1999.

Damages by natural disasters

In 1990-91, the line was severed for a year by landslides caused by torrential rain, with a further eight-month period of disruption occurring in 1993-94.

A three-month period of disruption occurred in 2004, and the line was severed from July 2012 until August 2013 due to further landslides induced by torrential rainfall.

In 2016, the Kumamoto Earthquakes damage resulted in the closure of the section between Higo Ozu and Aso. The line has been restored since 8 August 2020.

Former connecting lines
 Minami Kumamoto Station: the 29 km Yūen Railway to Tomochi opened in sections between 1915 and 1932, and closed in 1964.
 Kamikumamoto Station: the 22 km  gauge Kumamoto Light Railway to Otsu opened 1907 and 1914, with a 2.4 km branch to Suizenji. Despite proposals to regauge the line to  gauge and electrify it, the anticipated development of the area did not occur at an acceptable rate and the line was closed in 1921.

References

Lines of Kyushu Railway Company
1067 mm gauge railways in Japan
Railways with Zig Zags
Railway lines opened in 1914
1914 establishments in Japan